Mehdi Assous (born September 25, 1977) is a retired male boxer from Algeria. He represented his native North African country at the 1996 Summer Olympics in Atlanta, Georgia, where he was stopped in the quarterfinals of the men's flyweight division (– 51 kg) by eventual bronze medalist Zoltan Lunka from Germany.

References
 sports-reference

1972 births
Living people
Flyweight boxers
Boxers at the 1996 Summer Olympics
Olympic boxers of Algeria
Algerian male boxers
21st-century Algerian people